Lieutenant-Commander Sir Peter Richard Buckley, KCVO, FRGS (31 January 1928 – 31 January 2022) was a British Royal Navy officer and courtier. He entered the Royal Navy as a cadet in 1945 and served until retiring in 1961 with the rank of Lieutenant-Commander. That year, he joined the household of Prince Edward, Duke of Kent, and Katharine, Duchess of Kent, as their Private Secretary, serving until retirement in 1989.

Buckley was appointed a Member (Fourth Class) of the Royal Victorian Order in 1968, and promoted to Commander in 1973 and Knight Commander in 1982. He was elected a Fellow of the Royal Geographical Society in 1999. A freemason, he was initiated in 1963, and served as Master of the Lodge of Assistance, United Grand Lodge of England, in 1967.  He died on his 94th birthday, on 31 January 2022.

References 

1928 births
2022 deaths
Knights Commander of the Royal Victorian Order
Royal Navy officers